Mount Percy is a prominent mountain, 765 m, the highest feature on Joinville Island, standing immediately north of Mount Alexander near the center of the island. Discovered by a British expedition under James Clark Ross on December 30, 1842, and named for admiral Josceline Percy, Royal Navy, (1784–1856). Although this mountain is not surmounted by twin peaks, as described by Ross, there are a number of peaks of similar height in its vicinity, one of which may have given rise to Ross' description.

Mountains of Graham Land
Landforms of the Joinville Island group